Province House is where the Prince Edward Island Legislature, known as the Legislative Assembly of Prince Edward Island, has met since 1847. The building is located at the intersection of Richmond and Great George Streets in Charlottetown; it is Canada's second-oldest seat of government.

History 
The cornerstone was laid in May 1843 and it commenced operation for the first time in January 1847. The entire structure was built for a cost of £10,000 and was designed by Isaac Smith. Smith was a self-trained architect from Yorkshire, who also designed the residence of the Lieutenant Governor of Prince Edward Island. It was built by Island craftsmen during a time of prosperity for the colony. Its architectural lines include Greek and Roman influences, common to public buildings in North America built during this era.

From September 1–7, 1864, Province House had an important role in helping Prince Edward Island host the Charlottetown Conference which resulted in Canadian Confederation.

In 1973, Parks Canada approached the government of Prince Edward Island with a proposal for joint management and restoration of the structure in recognition of its important role in Canadian history. Under the ensuing agreement, both parties agreed to a 99-year period of joint management. Parks Canada paid for a $3.5 million (CAD) restoration from 1979–1983 which involved part of the building being restored to the 1864 period. The provincial legislature occupies one end of the building, whereas the restored Confederation Chamber displays the room where the Charlottetown Conference meetings occurred.

On April 20, 1995, a powerful pipe bomb exploded beneath a wooden wheelchair ramp on the north side of Province House, destroying glass in windows and causing some minor structural damage. Several passersby were injured and the explosion occurred only five minutes after an entire class of school children on a tour of the building had passed through the area. The bombing occurred only one day after the Oklahoma City bombing and is considered to be a copycat action. Responsibility was claimed by a group calling itself Loki 7; however, a subsequent police investigation and criminal court case blamed a single individual, Roger Charles Bell.

In 2015, Province House was closed for repairs and conservation work. The legislature moved to the adjacent Hon. George Coles Building, where it is expected to remain for several years. The building is planned to reopen at some point in 2023.

Province House National Historic Site
Province House was designated a National Historic Site of Canada in 1973. It is one of only three provincial legislative buildings, along with Province House in Halifax and the Saskatchewan Legislative Building in Regina, to be so designated. Province House is also designated under the provincial Heritage Places Protection Act.

Visitors can tour the 1860s period rooms, which include displays about the Charlottetown Conference, the building and the Provincial Legislative Assembly. An audio-visual presentation about the Conference is available, titled "A Great Dream".

Monuments and memorials

In front of the Legislature on Grafton Street is the Charlottetown Veterans Memorial consisting of three soldiers. The bronze memorial by G. W. Hill commemorates the dead from the two World Wars and the Korean War.

A Boer War Memorial by Hamilton MacCarthy was erected to honour the members of the Royal Canadian Regiment on the side of legislature.

A series of plaques commemorating the province's Fathers of Confederation are found along the side of the building:

 Edward Whelan
 Thomas Heath Haviland 
 Edward Palmer
 John Hamilton Gray
 Andrew Archibald Macdonald
 William Henry Pope
 George Coles

A small statue of Eckhart the Mouse from David Weale's children's story The True Meaning of Crumbfest is also found on the grounds of legislature.

References

External links 

 
 Province House, Charlottetown at the Canadian Encyclopedia

Buildings and structures in Charlottetown
Greek Revival architecture in Canada
Legislative buildings in Canada
National Historic Sites in Prince Edward Island
Museums in Prince Edward Island
History museums in Canada
General Assembly of Prince Edward Island
Terminating vistas in Canada
Government buildings completed in 1847
1847 establishments in Prince Edward Island
Monuments and memorials in Prince Edward Island